Crasville-la-Mallet is a commune in the Seine-Maritime department in the Normandy region in northern France.

Geography

Population

Places of interest
 The church of St.Vaast, dating from the sixteenth century.
 The chapel at the hamlet of Pleine-Sevette.
 A sixteenth-century stone cross.

See also
Communes of the Seine-Maritime department

References

Communes of Seine-Maritime